Koyuncular (literally "sheepmen") is a Turkish word. It may refer to:

 Koyuncular, Bozdoğan, a village in the district of Bozdoğan, Aydın Province, Turkey
 Koyuncular, Hopa, a village in the district of Hopa, Artvin Province, Turkey

See also
 Koyuncu (disambiguation)